Beaver Township is a civil township of Newaygo County in the U.S. state of Michigan.  As of the 2000 census, the township population was 608.

Communities
Cole Creek there was a post office with this name in the township from 1904 until 1907.

Geography

Demographics
As of the census of 2000, there were 608 people, 196 households, and 153 families residing in the township.  The population density was 17.1 per square mile (6.6/km2).  There were 292 housing units at an average density of 8.2 per square mile (3.2/km2).  The racial makeup of the township was 91.94% White, 2.30% African American, 0.49% Native American, 3.95% from other races, and 1.32% from two or more races. Hispanic or Latino of any race were 4.77% of the population.

There were 196 households, out of which 41.3% had children under the age of 18 living with them, 63.3% were married couples living together, 9.2% had a female householder with no husband present, and 21.9% were non-families. 20.4% of all households were made up of individuals, and 8.7% had someone living alone who was 65 years of age or older.  The average household size was 2.93 and the average family size was 3.36.

In the township the population was spread out, with 31.4% under the age of 18, 9.0% from 18 to 24, 26.5% from 25 to 44, 22.9% from 45 to 64, and 10.2% who were 65 years of age or older.  The median age was 35 years. For every 100 females, there were 111.1 males.  For every 100 females age 18 and over, there were 103.4 males.

The median income for a household in the township was $29,500, and the median income for a family was $33,036. Males had a median income of $33,958 versus $20,556 for females. The per capita income for the township was $11,098.  About 16.4% of families and 20.4% of the population were below the poverty line, including 32.1% of those under age 18 and none of those age 65 or over.

References

Notes

Sources

Townships in Newaygo County, Michigan
Grand Rapids metropolitan area
Townships in Michigan